Victor Haim Perera (1934 - 14 June 2003) was an author and journalist primarily concerned with Latin America and Sephardic Jewry. He was best known for his history of the Sephardic Jews, The Cross and The Pear Tree (1995), which traced the path of his own family from 15th-century Spain to 20th-century Guatemala.

Personal life
Perera was born in Guatemala to Sephardic Jewish parents. After the end of the Second World War, the family left an increasingly dangerous Guatemala for Brooklyn, New York. Perera studied at Brooklyn College, and went on to study English at the University of Michigan. There he met, and in 1960 married, Padma Hejmadi, an Indian writer/artist and Hindu. The marriage, which caused a rift in his family, broke down in 1972, and Perera moved to California. In his writing, he expressed his belief that his family was suffering under a curse for leaving Palestine two generations earlier.

After retiring, he co-founded Sephardic/Mizrahi Artists and Writers International, which sponsors the Sephardic arts. In 1998 Perera suffered a severe stroke while swimming, and was largely forced to give up his writing. He had been working on a book about whales.

Writing career
Perera's first job was as a fact-checker at The New Yorker. Working as a journalist, he also taught journalism for 20 years at the University of California's campuses at Santa Cruz and Berkeley. His numerous articles and essays were published by, among others, The Atlantic, Harper's, The Nation, The New York Review of Books, and The New Yorker.

His writing included ethnographic work as well. With the anthropologist Robert D. Bruce, he wrote Last Lords of Palenque (1982), a first-hand account of life among the Lacandon Indians. In Unfinished Conquest: The Guatemalan Tragedy (1993), he collected oral accounts of the lives of modern Mayans, and of the murders of many of them by the country's army. These books helped enhance his reputation as a voice for the oppressed.

Works
 The Conversion (1970), a novel
The Loch Ness Monster watchers: an essay by Victor Perera (1974)
 Last Lords of Palenque (1982), an ethnographic study co-written by Robert Bruce
 Rites (1986), a memoir, republished in a new edition by Eland in 2011
 Unfinished Conquest: The Guatemalan Tragedy (1993), a history of Mayan persecution
 The Cross and The Pear Tree (1995), a family history

References

Jewish American writers
Guatemalan emigrants to the United States
1934 births
2003 deaths
20th-century American non-fiction writers
20th-century Guatemalan writers
21st-century Guatemalan writers
Guatemalan male writers
20th-century male writers
University of Michigan College of Literature, Science, and the Arts alumni
Brooklyn College alumni
Writers from Brooklyn
Male non-fiction writers
20th-century American Jews
21st-century American Jews
20th-century American male writers